Ziua (The Day in Romanian) was a major Romanian daily newspaper published in Bucharest. It was published in Romanian with a fairly sizeable and often informative English section. Ziua was founded in 1994 by Sorin Roşca Stănescu, eventually becoming foreign-owned. It was the most conservative of the major Romanian dailies, often taking a Christian-nationalist point of view in its opinion pieces.

The Internet site of the paper, in addition to featuring almost all the contents of the Romanian edition, featured a daily selection of articles translated into English. Moreover, Ziua's website featured one of the most complete free online newspaper archives in Romania, stretching back to January 1998.

There used to be several regional editions of the paper, including Ziua de Vest, Ziua de Iaşi, Ziua de Constanţa, and Ziua de Cluj. These newspapers either survive as stand-alone spin-offs, with independent editorial supervision or have been sold (and subsequently renamed).

The last edition of the newspaper was printed on 7 January 2010, the last front page editorial quoting unsustainable mounting losses coupled with a general economic recession. The same editorial promised that only the print edition of the newspaper will be shut down, the online edition continuing to be produced. However, the last update to the website's content occurred at 21:00 on the 7th of January, with a final update on the 12th of January replacing the front page with a message announcing that the newspaper has completely ceased to exist.

References

Newspapers published in Bucharest
Publications established in 1994